Huth is a town in 'Amran Governorate, Yemen, and the seat of Huth District. It is located on the route between Sanaa and Sa'dah, on a plateau to the north of the Bawn plains.

Name and history 
According to the 10th-century writer al-Hamdani, Huth is named after ‘Abdullah b. al-Sabi‘, who was also called Huth and belonged to the tribe of Hashid. The name was initially applied both to a tribe and to its territory, with the modern town of Huth possibly serving as its capital. Medieval Huth was probably most important as a stopping point on the Sanaa-Sa'dah route, rather than as a strategic or administrative center.

See also 
 Houthi tribe

References 

Populated places in 'Amran Governorate